Basarab VI (? – 1529) was the son of the usurper Mehmed-bey who ruled Wallachia briefly in 1529 after the death of Radu of Afumati.

References 

|-

Wallachia
16th-century people from the Ottoman Empire
16th-century Romanian people
16th-century rulers in Europe